This is a full list of color palettes for notable video game console hardware.

For each unique palette, an image color test chart and sample image (original True color version follows) rendered with that palette (without dithering unless otherwise noted) are given. The test chart shows the full 8-bit, 256 levels of the red, green and blue (RGB) primary colors and cyan, magenta and yellow complementary colors, along with a full 8-bit, 256 levels grayscale. Gradients of full saturation of intermediate colors (orange, yellow-green, green-cyan, blue-cyan, violet, and red-magenta), and a full hue spectrum are also present. Color charts are not gamma corrected.

Atari

Atari 2600

The Television Interface Adaptor (TIA) is the custom computer chip that generated graphics for the Atari Video Computer System game console. 
It generated different YIQ color palettes dependent on the television signal format used.

NTSC
With the NTSC format, a 128-color palette was available, built based on eight luma values and 15 combinations of I and Q chroma signals (plus I = Q = 0 for a pure grayscale):

{|
| 
| 
| style="vertical-align:top;" | 
|}

{|class="wikitable"
! Hue
|style="width: 16px; text-align: center;" | 0
|style="width: 16px; text-align: center;" | 1
|style="width: 16px; text-align: center;" | 2
|style="width: 16px; text-align: center;" | 3
|style="width: 16px; text-align: center;" | 4
|style="width: 16px; text-align: center;" | 5
|style="width: 16px; text-align: center;" | 6
|style="width: 16px; text-align: center;" | 7
|style="width: 16px; text-align: center;" | 8
|style="width: 16px; text-align: center;" | 9
| 10
| 11
| 12
| 13
| 14
| 15
|-
!Luma
|
|
|
|
|
|
|
|
|
|
|
|
|
|
|
|
|-
| 0, 1
| style="color:white; background:#000;" |
| style="color:white; background:#440;" |
| style="color:white; background:#702800;" |
| style="color:white; background:#841800;" |
| style="color:white; background:#880000;" |
| style="color:white; background:#78005c;" |
| style="color:white; background:#480078;" |
| style="color:white; background:#140084;" |
| style="color:white; background:#000088;" |
| style="color:white; background:#00187c;" |
| style="color:white; background:#002c5c;" |
| style="color:white; background:#003c2c;" |
| style="color:white; background:#003c00;" |
| style="color:white; background:#143800;" |
| style="color:white; background:#2c3000;" |
| style="color:white; background:#442800;" |
|-
| 2, 3
| style="color:white; background:#404040;" |
| style="color:white; background:#646410;" |
| style="color:white; background:#844414;" |
| style="color:white; background:#983418;" |
| style="color:white; background:#9c2020;" |
| style="color:white; background:#8c2074;" |
| style="color:white; background:#602090;" |
| style="color:white; background:#302098;" |
| style="color:white; background:#1c209c;" |
| style="color:white; background:#1c3890;" |
| style="color:white; background:#1c4c78;" |
| style="color:white; background:#1c5c48;" |
| style="color:white; background:#205c20;" |
| style="color:white; background:#345c1c;" |
| style="color:white; background:#4c501c;" |
| style="color:white; background:#644818;" |
|-
| 4, 5
| style="color:white; background:#6c6c6c;" |
| style="color:white; background:#848424;" |
| style="color:white; background:#985c28;" |
| style="color:white; background:#ac5030;" |
| style="color:white; background:#b03c3c;" |
| style="color:white; background:#a03c88;" |
| style="color:white; background:#783ca4;" |
| style="color:white; background:#4c3cac;" |
| style="color:white; background:#3840b0;" |
| style="color:white; background:#3854a8;" |
| style="color:white; background:#386890;" |
| style="color:white; background:#387c64;" |
| style="color:white; background:#407c40;" |
| style="color:white; background:#507c38;" |
| style="color:white; background:#687034;" |
| style="color:white; background:#846830;" |
|-
| 6, 7
| style="color:white; background:#909090;" |
| style="color:white; background:#a0a034;" |
| style="color:white; background:#ac783c;" |
| style="color:white; background:#c06848;" |
| style="color:white; background:#c05858;" |
| style="color:white; background:#b0589c;" |
| style="color:white; background:#8c58b8;" |
| style="color:white; background:#6858c0;" |
| style="color:white; background:#505cc0;" |
| style="color:white; background:#5070bc;" |
| style="color:white; background:#5084ac;" |
| style="color:white; background:#509c80;" |
| style="color:white; background:#5c9c5c;" |
| style="color:white; background:#6c9850;" |
| style="color:white; background:#848c4c;" |
| style="color:white; background:#a08444;" |
|-
| 8, 9
| style="color:white; background:#b0b0b0;" |
| style="color:white; background:#b8b840;" |
| style="color:white; background:#bc8c4c;" |
| style="color:white; background:#d0805c;" |
| style="color:white; background:#d07070;" |
| style="color:white; background:#c070b0;" |
| style="color:white; background:#a070cc;" |
| style="color:white; background:#7c70d0;" |
| style="color:white; background:#6874d0;" |
| style="color:white; background:#6888cc;" |
| style="color:white; background:#689cc0;" |
| style="color:white; background:#68b494;" |
| style="color:white; background:#74b474;" |
| style="color:white; background:#84b468;" |
| style="color:white; background:#9ca864;" |
| style="color:white; background:#b89c58;" |
|-
| 10, 11
| style="color:white; background:#c8c8c8;" |
| style="color:white; background:#d0d050;" |
| style="color:white; background:#cca05c;" |
| style="color:white; background:#e09470;" |
| style="color:white; background:#e08888;" |
| style="color:white; background:#d084c0;" |
| style="color:white; background:#b484dc;" |
| style="color:white; background:#9488e0;" |
| style="color:white; background:#7c8ce0;" |
| style="color:white; background:#7c9cdc;" |
| style="color:white; background:#7cb4d4;" |
| style="color:white; background:#7cd0ac;" |
| style="color:white; background:#8cd08c;" |
| style="color:white; background:#9ccc7c;" |
| style="color:white; background:#b4c078;" |
| style="color:white; background:#d0b46c;" |
|-
| 12, 13
| style="color:white; background:#dcdcdc;" |
| style="color:white; background:#e8e85c;" |
| style="color:white; background:#dcb468;" |
| style="color:white; background:#eca880;" |
| style="color:white; background:#eca0a0;" |
| style="color:white; background:#dc9cd0;" |
| style="color:white; background:#c49cec;" |
| style="color:white; background:#a8a0ec;" |
| style="color:white; background:#90a4ec;" |
| style="color:white; background:#90b4ec;" |
| style="color:white; background:#90cce8;" |
| style="color:white; background:#90e4c0;" |
| style="color:white; background:#a4e4a4;" |
| style="color:white; background:#b4e490;" |
| style="color:white; background:#ccd488;" |
| style="color:white; background:#e8cc7c;" |
|-
| 14, 15
| style="color:white; background:#ececec;" |
| style="color:white; background:#fcfc68;" |
| style="color:white; background:#ecc878;" |
| style="color:white; background:#fcbc94;" |
| style="color:white; background:#fcb4b4;" |
| style="color:white; background:#ecb0e0;" |
| style="color:white; background:#d4b0fc;" |
| style="color:white; background:#bcb4fc;" |
| style="color:white; background:#a4b8fc;" |
| style="color:white; background:#a4c8fc;" |
| style="color:white; background:#a4e0fc;" |
| style="color:white; background:#a4fcd4;" |
| style="color:white; background:#b8fcb8;" |
| style="color:white; background:#c8fca4;" |
| style="color:white; background:#e0ec9c;" |
| style="color:white; background:#fce08c;" |
|}
The above image assumes there is no limit on the number of colors per scan line. With the system's actual color restrictions (and proper change in aspect ratio), the same image would look very different:
{|
| 
|}

PAL
With the PAL format, a 104-color palette was available. 128-color entries could still be selected, but due to the different color encoding scheme, 32 color entries results in the same eight shades of gray:

{|
| 
| 
|style="vertical-align:top;" |
|}

{|class="wikitable" style="border-style: none" border="1" cellpadding="5"
! Hue
|style="width: 16px; text-align: center;" | 0
|style="width: 16px; text-align: center;" | 1
|style="width: 16px; text-align: center;" | 2
|style="width: 16px; text-align: center;" | 3
|style="width: 16px; text-align: center;" | 4
|style="width: 16px; text-align: center;" | 5
|style="width: 16px; text-align: center;" | 6
|style="width: 16px; text-align: center;" | 7
|style="width: 16px; text-align: center;" | 8
|style="width: 16px; text-align: center;" | 9
| 10
| 11
| 12
| 13
| 14
| 15
|-
!Luma
|
|
|
|
|
|
|
|
|
|
|
|
|
|
|
|
|-
| 0, 1
| style="color:white; background:#000;" |
| style="color:white; background:#000;" |
| style="color:white; background:#805800;" |
| style="color:white; background:#445c00;" |
| style="color:white; background:#703400;" |
| style="color:white; background:#006414;" |
| style="color:white; background:#700014;" |
| style="color:white; background:#005c5c;" |
| style="color:white; background:#70005c;" |
| style="color:white; background:#003c70;" |
| style="color:white; background:#580070;" |
| style="color:white; background:#002070;" |
| style="color:white; background:#3c0080;" |
| style="color:white; background:#000088;" |
| style="color:white; background:#000;" |
| style="color:white; background:#000;" |
|-
| 2, 3
| style="color:white; background:#282828;" |
| style="color:white; background:#282828;" |
| style="color:white; background:#947020;" |
| style="color:white; background:#5c7820;" |
| style="color:white; background:#885020;" |
| style="color:white; background:#208034;" |
| style="color:white; background:#882034;" |
| style="color:white; background:#207474;" |
| style="color:white; background:#842074;" |
| style="color:white; background:#1c5888;" |
| style="color:white; background:#6c2088;" |
| style="color:white; background:#1c3c88;" |
| style="color:white; background:#542094;" |
| style="color:white; background:#20209c;" |
| style="color:white; background:#282828;" |
| style="color:white; background:#282828;" |
|-
| 4, 5
| style="color:white; background:#505050;" |
| style="color:white; background:#505050;" |
| style="color:white; background:#a8843c;" |
| style="color:white; background:#74903c;" |
| style="color:white; background:#a0683c;" |
| style="color:white; background:#3c9850;" |
| style="color:white; background:#a03c50;" |
| style="color:white; background:#3c8c8c;" |
| style="color:white; background:#943c88;" |
| style="color:white; background:#3874a0;" |
| style="color:white; background:#803ca0;" |
| style="color:white; background:#3858a0;" |
| style="color:white; background:#6c3ca8;" |
| style="color:white; background:#3c3cb0;" |
| style="color:white; background:#505050;" |
| style="color:white; background:#505050;" |
|-
| 6, 7
| style="color:white; background:#747474;" |
| style="color:white; background:#747474;" |
| style="color:white; background:#bc9c58;" |
| style="color:white; background:#8cac58;" |
| style="color:white; background:#b48458;" |
| style="color:white; background:#58b06c;" |
| style="color:white; background:#b4586c;" |
| style="color:white; background:#58a4a4;" |
| style="color:white; background:#a8589c;" |
| style="color:white; background:#508cb4;" |
| style="color:white; background:#9458b4;" |
| style="color:white; background:#5074b4;" |
| style="color:white; background:#8058bc;" |
| style="color:white; background:#5858c0;" |
| style="color:white; background:#747474;" |
| style="color:white; background:#747474;" |
|-
| 8, 9
| style="color:white; background:#949494;" |
| style="color:white; background:#949494;" |
| style="color:white; background:#ccac70;" |
| style="color:white; background:#a0c070;" |
| style="color:white; background:#c89870;" |
| style="color:white; background:#70c484;" |
| style="color:white; background:#c87084;" |
| style="color:white; background:#70b8b8;" |
| style="color:white; background:#b470b0;" |
| style="color:white; background:#68a4c8;" |
| style="color:white; background:#a470c8;" |
| style="color:white; background:#6888c8;" |
| style="color:white; background:#9470cc;" |
| style="color:white; background:#7070d0;" |
| style="color:white; background:#949494;" |
| style="color:white; background:#949494;" |
|-
| 10, 11
| style="color:white; background:#b4b4b4;" |
| style="color:white; background:#b4b4b4;" |
| style="color:white; background:#dcc084;" |
| style="color:white; background:#b0d484;" |
| style="color:white; background:#dcac84;" |
| style="color:white; background:#84d89c;" |
| style="color:white; background:#dc849c;" |
| style="color:white; background:#84c8c8;" |
| style="color:white; background:#c484c0;" |
| style="color:white; background:#7cb8dc;" |
| style="color:white; background:#b484dc;" |
| style="color:white; background:#7ca0dc;" |
| style="color:white; background:#a884dc;" |
| style="color:white; background:#8484e0;" |
| style="color:white; background:#b4b4b4;" |
| style="color:white; background:#b4b4b4;" |
|-
| 12, 13
| style="color:white; background:#d0d0d0;" |
| style="color:white; background:#d0d0d0;" |
| style="color:white; background:#ecd09c;" |
| style="color:white; background:#c4e89c;" |
| style="color:white; background:#ecc09c;" |
| style="color:white; background:#9ce8b4;" |
| style="color:white; background:#ec9cb4;" |
| style="color:white; background:#9cdcdc;" |
| style="color:white; background:#d09cd0;" |
| style="color:white; background:#90ccec;" |
| style="color:white; background:#c49cec;" |
| style="color:white; background:#90b4ec;" |
| style="color:white; background:#b89cec;" |
| style="color:white; background:#9c9cec;" |
| style="color:white; background:#d0d0d0;" |
| style="color:white; background:#d0d0d0;" |
|-
| 14, 15
| style="color:white; background:#ececec;" |
| style="color:white; background:#ececec;" |
| style="color:white; background:#fce0b0;" |
| style="color:white; background:#d4fcb0;" |
| style="color:white; background:#fcd4b0;" |
| style="color:white; background:#b0fcc8;" |
| style="color:white; background:#fcb0c8;" |
| style="color:white; background:#b0ecec;" |
| style="color:white; background:#e0b0e0;" |
| style="color:white; background:#a4e0fc;" |
| style="color:white; background:#d4b0fc;" |
| style="color:white; background:#a4c8fc;" |
| style="color:white; background:#c8b0fc;" |
| style="color:white; background:#b0b0fc;" |
| style="color:white; background:#ececec;" |
| style="color:white; background:#ececec;" |
|}

The above image assumes there is no limit on the number of colors per scanline. With the system's actual color restrictions (and proper change in aspect ratio), the same image would look very different:
{|
| 
|}

SECAM
{|
|
|
|}
The SECAM palette was reduced to a simple 3-bit RGB, containing only 8 colors (black, blue, red, magenta, green, cyan, yellow and white) by mapping the luma values:

{|class="wikitable" style="border-style: none; text-align: center;" border="1" cellpadding="5"
| style="width: 16px; color:white; background:#000;"| 0, 1
| style="width: 16px; color:white; background:#2121ff;"| 2, 3
| style="width: 16px; color:white; background:#ff0000;"| 4, 5
| style="width: 16px; color:black; background:#ff50ff;"| 6, 7
| style="width: 16px; color:black; background:#7fff00;"| 8, 9
| style="width: 16px; color:black; background:#7fffff;"| 10, 11
| style="width: 16px; color:black; background:#ffff3f;"| 12, 13
| style="width: 16px; color:black; background:#fff;"| 14, 15
|}

Lynx

The Atari Lynx used a 4096-color palette. The video hardware was custom built and designed by Jay Miner and David Morse It used two chips, named Mikey and Suzy.
Resolution was 160×102 pixels and it was possible to use 16 simultaneous colors per scanline.

{|
| 
| 
|}

Nintendo

NES
The Picture Processing Unit (PPU) used in the Nintendo Entertainment System generates color based on a composite video palette.

The 54-colors can be created based on four luma values, twelve combinations of I and Q chroma signals and two series of I = Q = 0 for several pure grays.
There are two identical whites, one of the blacks has less-than-zero brightness, and one of the lighter grays is within 2% of another, so sometimes the palette has been reported to have 52 to 55 colors.

In addition to this, it had 3 color emphasis bits which can be used to dim the entire palette by any combination of red, green and blue. This extends the total available colors to 448, but inconveniently divided into 8 variations of the base 56. Because it affects the whole palette at once it may be considered more of a filter effect applied to the image, rather than an increased palette range.

The PPU produces colors outside of the TV color gamut, resulting in some colors being presented differently on different TV systems.

{|
| 
| 
|style="vertical-align:top;" |
|}

{|class="wikitable" style="border-style: none; text-align: center;" border="1" cellpadding="5"
|-
| style="width: 10pc;" | Hex Value
| style="width: 4pc;" | 0
| style="width: 4pc;" | 1
| style="width: 4pc;" | 2
| style="width: 4pc;" | 3
| style="width: 4pc;" | 4
| style="width: 4pc;" | 5
| style="width: 4pc;" | 6
| style="width: 4pc;" | 7
| style="width: 4pc;" | 8
| style="width: 4pc;" | 9
| style="width: 4pc;" | A
| style="width: 4pc;" | B
| style="width: 4pc;" | C
| style="width: 4pc;" | D
| style="width: 4pc;" | E
| style="width: 4pc;" | F
|-
| 0x00
| style="color:white; background:#59595f;"|
| style="color:white; background:#00008f;"|
| style="color:white; background:#18008f;"|
| style="color:white; background:#3f0077;"|
| style="color:white; background:#505;"|
| style="color:white; background:#501;"|
| style="color:white; background:#500;"|
| style="color:white; background:#420;"|
| style="color:white; background:#330;"|
| style="color:white; background:#130;"|
| style="color:white; background:#031;"|
| style="color:white; background:#044;"|
| style="color:white; background:#046;"|
| style="color:white; background:#000;"|
| style="color:white; background:#080808;"|
| style="color:white; background:#080808;"|
|-
| 0x10
| style="color:black; background:#aaa;"|
| style="color:white; background:#04d;"|
| style="color:white; background:#51e;"|
| style="color:white; background:#70e;"|
| style="color:white; background:#90b;"|
| style="color:white; background:#a05;"|
| style="color:white; background:#930;"|
| style="color:white; background:#840;"|
| style="color:white; background:#660;"|
| style="color:white; background:#360;"|
| style="color:white; background:#060;"|
| style="color:white; background:#065;"|
| style="color:white; background:#058;"|
| style="color:white; background:#080808;"|
| style="color:white; background:#080808;"|
| style="color:white; background:#080808;"|
|-
| 0x20
| style="color:black; background:#eee;"|
| style="color:black; background:#48f;"|
| style="color:black; background:#77f;"|
| style="color:black; background:#94f;"|
| style="color:black; background:#b4e;"|
| style="color:black; background:#c59;"|
| style="color:black; background:#d64;"|
| style="color:black; background:#c80;"|
| style="color:black; background:#ba0;"|
| style="color:black; background:#7b0;"|
| style="color:black; background:#2b2;"|
| style="color:black; background:#2b7;"|
| style="color:black; background:#2bc;"|
| style="color:white; background:#444;"|
| style="color:white; background:#080808;"|
| style="color:white; background:#080808;"|
|-
| 0x30
| style="color:black; background:#eee;"|
| style="color:black; background:#9cf;"|
| style="color:black; background:#aaf;"|
| style="color:black; background:#b9f;"|
| style="color:black; background:#d9f;"|
| style="color:black; background:#e9d;"|
| style="color:black; background:#eaa;"|
| style="color:black; background:#eb9;"|
| style="color:black; background:#ed8;"|
| style="color:black; background:#bd8;"|
| style="color:black; background:#9d9;"|
| style="color:black; background:#9db;"|
| style="color:black; background:#9de;"|
| style="color:black; background:#aaa;"|
| style="color:white; background:#080808;"|
| style="color:white; background:#080808;"|
|}

The NES PPU uses a background palette with up to 13 of these colors at a time, consisting of one common backdrop color and four subpalettes of three colors, chosen from the above set. The PPU's video memory layout allows choosing one subpalette for each 16×16 pixel area of the background. (A special video mode of the MMC5 mapper overrides this, assigning a subpalette to each 8×8-pixel tile.) Sprites have an additional set of four 3-color subpalettes (with color 0 being transparent in each) and every 8x8 or 8x16 pixels can have their own subpalette, allowing for a total of 12 different colors to use for sprites at any given time, or a total of 25 on-screen colors.

Because of the constraints mentioned above, converting a photograph often results in attribute clash at 16×16-pixel boundaries. Conversions with and without dithering follow, using the hex palette 0F160608 0F162720 0F090010 0F0A1910 (the repeated 0F represents black as the common backdrop color).

{|
| Without dithering
| With dithering
|-
| 
| 
|}

Game Boy
The original Game Boy uses a monochrome 4-shade palette. Because the non-backlit LCD display background is greenish, this results in a "greenscale" graphic display, as it is shown in the simulated image (at Game Boy display resolution), below. The Game Boy Pocket and Game Boy Light uses a monochrome 4-shade palette using actual gray.

{|
| Original Game Boy
| Game Boy Pocket/Light
|-
| 
| 
|}

Super NES
The Picture Processing Unit (PPU) used in the Super NES has a 15-bit RGB (32,768 color) palette, with up to 256 simultaneous colors.

However, while the hardware palette can only contain 256 entries, in most display modes the graphics are arranged into between 2 and 4 layers, and these layers can be combined using additive or subtractive color blending. 
Because these blended colors are calculated by the hardware itself, and do not have to be represented by any of the existing palette entries, the actual number of visible colors onscreen at any one time can be much higher.

The exact number depends on the number of layers, and the combination of colors used by these layers, as well as what blending mode and graphical effects are in use. In theory it can show the entire 32,768 colors, but in practice this is rarely the case for reasons such as memory use. Most games use 256-color mode, with 15-color palettes assigned to 8x8 pixel areas of the background.

{|
| Theoretical 32768-color
| Practical 256-color
|-
|
|
|}

Game Boy Color
The Game Boy Color systems use a 15-bit RGB (32,768 colors) palette.

The specific Game Boy Color (Type 3) game cartridges presents up to 56 colors without the use of special programming techniques from the full 32,768. From these, 32 are for a background palette, plus 8 hardware sprite palettes, with 3 colors plus transparent each. Typically sprite palettes share some colors (black, white or others), so the total colors displayed may be less than 56.

Though there is a 56 color limit, this in of itself is a palette storage limit and not an actual hardware limitation. As such, the programmer can swap out the palettes on a per-scanline basis. Because of this ability to swap out the palettes each scanline, over eight thousand colors can actually appear on screen per frame when programmed on a per-scanline basis.

{|
|Simulated
|-
|
|}

When an older monochrome original Game Boy game cartridge (Type 1) is plugged-in, if certain combinations of the controls are held during startup (or if the game is recognized from a hard-coded list in the device's ROM), the games are colorized with one of the factory 12 false color palettes. In this mode, games can have from 4 to 10 colors, four are for the background plane palette and there are two more hardware sprite plane palettes, with three colors plus transparent each. If the system does not have a palette stored for a game, it defaults to the "Dark green" palette.

The following shows these startup palettes (background plus both sprite planes) and the combination of controls used (the names are taken from the Game Boy Color user's manual; the colors are simulated):

{|
! Combo
! Up
! Down
! Left
! Right
|-
|
| Brown
| Pale yellow
| Blue
| Green
|-
! A
| Red
| Orange
| Dark blue
| Dark green
|-
! B
| Dark brown
| Yellow
| Gray
| Reverse
|}

{|
|Game Boy color palette mapping
|-
|
|}

Game Boy Advance
The Game Boy Advance/SP/Micro systems also uses a 15-bit RGB palette, and along with the original and Color modes, they have also a specific Highcolor 32,768 colors mode. The LCD displays of the Micro and some models of the SP are backlit, giving brighter images.

{|
| Compatible mode
| 32,768-color
|-
| 
| 
|}

DS

The DS has a display capable of using 18-bit RGB color palette, making a total of 262,144 possible colors; of these, 32,767 simultaneous colors can be displayed at once. The 18-bit color palette is only available in 3D video mode or in 2D modes when blending effects are used. The other video modes are similar to the GBA, but feature some enhancements. For example, the DS provides a number of 16 extended 256 color palettes for backgrounds as well as sprites on each of the two screens, allowing for a total of 8192 colors per frame (the practical number may be less due to some of the colors being considered transparent). The handheld's successor, Nintendo DS Lite, has brighter screens which makes some old GBA and NDS titles look different.

{|
| 
| 
|}

3DS
The 3DS has a 24-bit RGB palette.

Sega

Master System
The Master System had a 6-bit RGB palette (64 colors), with 31 colors on-screen at once. It is possible to display all 64 colors at once using raster effects (line interrupts). The console used a proprietary chip called Video Display Processor (VDP) with the same internal design as the Texas Instruments TMS9918 (used in the SG-1000), although with enhanced features such as extra colors.

There are only 512 different 8x8 tile patterns to cover the screen though, when 768 would be required for a complete 256x192 screen. This means that at least 1/3 of the tiles will have to be repeated. To help maximize tile reuse, they can be flipped either vertically or horizontally. The 64 sprites of 8x16 pixels can also be used to help to cover the screen (max 8 per scanline).

Because of the constraints mentioned above, there are no current accurate simulated screen images available for the Sega Master System.

{|
| 
| 
|style="vertical-align:top;" |
|}

Mega Drive/Genesis
The Mega Drive/Genesis used the Sega 315-5313 (Yamaha YM7101) Video Display Processor, providing a 9-bit RGB palette (512 colors, up to approximately 1500 including shadow and highlight mode) with up to 61 colors on-screen at once without raster effects (4 palette lines of 16 colors each, palette indices $x0 are definable but considered as transparent, and can only be used as the background color).

{|
| 
| 
|}

Game Gear
The Game Gear had a 12-bit RGB palette (4096 colors), with 32 colors on-screen at once.

{|
| 
| 
|}

32X

The Sega 32X had a 15-bit RGB palette (32768 colors), with all colors available for display.

{|
| 
| 
|}

NEC

TurboGrafx-16
The TurboGrafx-16 used a 9-bit RGB palette consisting of 512 colors with 482 colors on-screen at once (16 background palettes of 16 colors each, with at least 1 common color among all background palettes, and 16 sprite palettes of 15 colors each, plus transparent which is visible as the overscan area).

{|
| 
| 
|}

Fairchild

Channel F

The Fairchild Channel F is able to use one plane of graphics and one of four background colors per line, with three plot colors to choose from (red, green, and blue) that turned into white if the background is set to black, at a resolution of 128 × 64, with approximately 102 × 58 pixels visible.
{|
| 
| 
|}
In total there are 8 possible colors:

Mattel Electronics

Intellivision

The Intellivision uses a 16-color palette.

Epoch

Super Cassette Vision

The Super Cassette Vision uses a 16-color palette.

Magnavox

Odyssey 2

The Magnavox Odyssey 2 uses a 4-bit RGBI color palette.
{|
| 
| 
|}

See also
Color depth
Computer monitor
Indexed color
List of 8-bit computer hardware palettes
List of 16-bit computer hardware palettes
List of color palettes
List of home computers by video hardware
List of monochrome and RGB color formats
List of software palettes
Palette (computing)

References

Computer graphics
Color depths
Computing output devices